Thirteen Lune is an e-commerce beauty website launched in 2020 and based in West Hollywood.

History 
Thirteen Lune was co-founded by Nyakio Grieco, a Los Angeles-based beauty entrepreneur, and Patrick Herning, the CEO of plus-sized fashion brand 11 Honoré. The company initially launched with 13 brands. By the end of 2021 the company carried 100 brands.

In October 2021, JCPenney announced a partnership with Thirteen Lune to bring their items into 10 of the retailer's physical stores. In January 2021, Thirteen Lune raised $1 million from Sean Combs, Gwyneth Paltrow, Naomi Watts, Gregg Renfrew, Tracey Cunningham (Mèche salon), Nicole Avant, Patrick Finnegan (venture capitalist) and Sydney Holland (Urban and The Mystic). 

In November 2021, Thirteen Lune closed a $3 million funding round by Fearless Fund, Capstar Ventures, Fab Ventures, Swiftarc Ventures and Gaingels.

In September 2022, JCPenney announced plans to expand its partnership, adding Thirteen Lune products to more than 600 stores around the country, while also ending its brick-and-mortar relationship with Sephora. In addition to offering 65 BIPOC-owned beauty brands, the store's associates will also receive training on how to address diverse beauty needs.

Products 
Thirteen Lune is a direct-to-consumer company that highlights skin care, makeup, hair care and wellness items almost exclusively (90%) from Black and Brown-owned companies. Their products are primarily targeted at under-represented people of color. The remaining 10% represent Ally Brands, which are selected brands the retailer recognizes for their continued efforts to "be exclusive in product assortment and promote change beyond beauty."

References

External links 

 

Online companies of the United States
Makeup
Skin care brands
Hair care products
American companies established in 2020